Montenegrin may refer to:

 Adjective for anything related to Montenegro
 Demonym referring to the people of Montenegro, see Demographics of Montenegro
 Ethnonym, referring to Montenegrins, the ethnic group associated with Montenegro
 Montenegrin language, a variety of Serbo-Croatian spoken by ethnic Montenegrins
 Montenegrin (party), a liberal political party in Montenegro

See also
 Montenegrin Campaign (World War I)
 Montenegrin Cup (women), the national women's association football cup competition in Montenegro.
 Montenegrin Football Championship (1922–1940)
 Montenegrin Football Championship (1925-1940)
 Montenegrin Prince-Bishop
 Montenegrin Republic Cup (1947–2006), cup competition for Montenegrin lower-tier clubs 
 Montenegrin independent championship (1992–99), the unofficial football and futsal competition in Montenegro, 
Montenegrins (disambiguation)
Montenegro (disambiguation)
 Montenegrin people (disambiguation)
 Montenegrin Church (disambiguation)
 Montenegrin Orthodox Church (disambiguation)
 Montenegrin independence referendum (disambiguation)
 Montenegrin people (disambiguation)
 

Language and nationality disambiguation pages